Paul Dyck (born April 15, 1971) is a Canadian former professional ice hockey defenceman and currently the head coach and general manager of the Manitoba Junior Hockey League's Steinbach Pistons.

Playing career
Dyck played major junior hockey with the Moose Jaw Warriors of the Western Hockey League and was drafted 236th overall by the Pittsburgh Penguins in the 1991 NHL Entry Draft.  He spent ten seasons in the International Hockey League, mostly with the Cleveland Lumberjacks and Houston Aeros, and was a member of the Aeros' 1999 Turner Cup championship team.  Dyck moved to Germany in 2001 and played four seasons in the Deutsche Eishockey Liga with the Iserlohn Roosters and Krefeld Pinguine, and was a member of Krefeld's championship team in 2002-03.  Dyck played one season with the Schwenninger Wild Wings of the 2nd Bundesliga and then retired from professional hockey in 2006.

Coaching career
Dyck resides in his hometown of Steinbach, Manitoba and has worked for the Manitoba Junior Hockey League's Steinbach Pistons since 2010: as head coach since December 2011 and the dual role of general manager and head coach since July 2012.  Dyck has led the Pistons to two league championships (2013, 2018) and been selected to coach at the Canadian Junior Hockey League Prospects Game (2015) and World Junior A Challenge (2015, 2020). Dyck was named winner of the Muzz McPherson Award as MJHL Coach of the Year in 2016-17 and ranks in the league's top ten list for total wins as a head coach.

Career statistics

Awards
 1998-99, Turner Cup Champion
 2002-03, DEL Champion
 2012-13, MJHL Champion (as coach)
 2016-17, MJHL Coach of the Year
 2017-18, MJHL Champion (as coach)
 2017-18, ANAVET Cup Champion (as coach)
 2017-18, MJHL Coach of the Year

External links

References

1971 births
Living people
Canadian ice hockey defencemen
Canadian Mennonites
Cleveland Lumberjacks players
Dauphin Kings players
Detroit Vipers players
Houston Aeros (1994–2013) players
Ice hockey people from Manitoba
Iserlohn Roosters players
Kansas City Blades players
Krefeld Pinguine players
Moose Jaw Warriors players
Muskegon Lumberjacks players
Pittsburgh Penguins draft picks
Schwenninger Wild Wings players
Sportspeople from Steinbach, Manitoba